The State Register of Heritage Places is maintained by the Heritage Council of Western Australia. , 143 places are heritage-listed in the Shire of Augusta-Margaret River, of which eleven are on the State Register of Heritage Places.

List
The Western Australian State Register of Heritage Places, lists the following eleven state registered places within the Shire of Augusta-Margaret River:

References

Augusta
 
Augusta